José Ilson dos Santos also known as Taílson (born 28 November 1975) is a Brazilian football player.

Club statistics

References

External links

 "Tailson" José Ilson Dos Santos
 Profile & stats - Lokeren
 Profile - Lierse

1975 births
Living people
Brazilian footballers
Brazilian expatriate footballers
Expatriate footballers in China
Expatriate footballers in Japan
Belgian Pro League players
J1 League players
Gamba Osaka players
Changsha Ginde players
Chinese Super League players
Botafogo Futebol Clube (SP) players
S.C. Braga players
América Futebol Clube (MG) players
Club Athletico Paranaense players
Fortaleza Esporte Clube players
Paulista Futebol Clube players
Esporte Clube Juventude players
Sport Club do Recife players
Royal Excel Mouscron players
K.S.C. Lokeren Oost-Vlaanderen players
Lierse S.K. players
Expatriate footballers in Belgium
Esporte Clube XV de Novembro (Piracicaba) players
Sociedade Esportiva Matonense players
Brazil under-20 international footballers
Association football forwards